Graves Chapel and Cemetery, also known as Graves Church, is a historic Methodist church located at Stanley, Page County, Virginia. It was built in 1856, and is a simple one-story, frame church building.  It was enlarged about 1870. The center entry and flanking windows on the front gable end have Gothic Revival lancet arches and the gable roof is topped by and open belfry.  Also on the property are the contributing church cemetery with burials dating to 1860, and the parsonage, a two-story frame residence built about 1893.

It was listed on the National Register of Historic Places in 2008.

References

Churches on the National Register of Historic Places in Virginia
Methodist churches in Virginia
Churches completed in 1856
Carpenter Gothic church buildings in Virginia
Buildings and structures in Page County, Virginia
National Register of Historic Places in Page County, Virginia